Qianhaiwan station is a station on the Line 1, Line 5 and Line 11 of the Shenzhen Metro in Shenzhen, Guangdong Province, China. Line 1 platforms opened on 15 June 2011, Line 5 platforms opened on 22 June 2011, and Line 11 platforms opened on 28 June 2016. Qianhaiwan Station is located under Chenwen Road in Shenzhen's Nanshan District.

Station layout

Exits

References

External links
 Shenzhen Metro Qianhaiwan Station (Line 1) (Chinese)
 Shenzhen Metro Qianhaiwan Station (Line 1) (English)
 Shenzhen Metro Qianhaiwan Station (Line 5) (Chinese)
 Shenzhen Metro Qianhaiwan Station (Line 5) (English)
 Shenzhen Metro Qianhaiwan Station (Line 11) (Chinese)
 Shenzhen Metro Qianhaiwan Station (Line 11) (English)

Shenzhen Metro stations
Railway stations in Guangdong
Nanshan District, Shenzhen
Railway stations in China opened in 2010